Clavulina arcuatus is a species of coral fungus in the family Clavulinaceae. Found in Cameroon, it was described in 2007.

References

External links

Fungi described in 2007
Fungi of Africa
arcuatus